The Lodge Farm estate is located in the area of Short Heath in the town of Willenhall, which is in the Metropolitan Borough of Walsall.

The estate is centred primarily within the interior loop of Stroud Avenue. It comprises mainly current and former council properties and a smaller number of more recently built private houses. It is closely connected to the Brackendale estate, which is situated around the exterior loop of Stroud Avenue and comprises mainly detached and semi-detached private housing whose construction pre-dates that on the Lodge Farm estate. Due to their close proximity, the two estates are often mistaken for each other. It is served by a small number of convenience stores and is also home to one pub called The Homestead. For many years, it was also served by a pub called the Cavalcade, but this has now been demolished and the land will possibly be used for housing. A children's home used to lie on Stroud Avenue (Drum and Bass star Goldie being one of its ex-residents). A care home for the elderly and a family centre also lie on the estate. The estate is also home to a large field which once housed the Lodge Farm itself, but has no play area for youngsters.

The estate is divided from the neighbouring estates of Bentley & the Briarsleigh Estate by a disused railway, known locally as The Banks. Lodge Farm also borders Willenhall Lawn Cemetery and Lane Head.

The estate has good educational provision, being the home to four schools (Rosedale CE Infant School, Short Heath Junior School, Lodge Farm Primary School & Willenhall School Sports College).

Public transport 
Bus
Lodge Farm is well served by local bus services, linking the estate to Willenhall, New Invention, Darlaston and Walsall. Buses serving the estate are:

 37 Walsall - Darlaston - Willenhall 
National Express West Midlands (all services)
 41  Walsall - Lodge Farm - Willenhall 
National Express West Midlands (Mon - Sat all day and Sunday daytime) & Diamond West Midlands (Sunday evenings)

Additionally services 69 (Walsall - Wolverhampton) & 326 (Bilston - Willenhall - Bloxwich) travel along the border of the estate. These are operated by National Express West Midlands (69) and Diamond West Midlands (326).
Rail
The nearest train station in terms of distance is Bloxwich North railway station, but in travelling times is Walsall railway station.
Tram
One of the numerous extension plans for the West Midlands Metro tram network was the 5W route, linking Wolverhampton, Walsall, Willenhall, Wednesfield and Wednesbury which would travel along The Banks. However, this plan has been ruled out due to insufficient demand.

References

Willenhall